Gérard Gefen (3 July 1934 – 6 August 2003) was a French musicologist and writer.  He was also a journalist and music critic, translator, radio and classical record producer.

Career 
Gefen studied philosophy and political science together with art history and music and eventually turned to music.

He produced programmes for Radio France and collaborated with several music press magazines (La Lettre du musicien...), in particular as editor-in-chief of Symphonia.

He is buried in the Ville-d'Avray cemetery.

Publications 

Monographs 
  — Reissue updated:
 Wilhelm Furtwängler: la puissance et la gloire, éditions de l'Archipel 2001  — preface by Elisabeth Furtwängler. With audio disc. Followed by Je n'ai pas cédé, unpublished work.
 
 L'Assassinat de Jean-Marie Leclair : récit, Belfond 1990  — foreword by Philippe Beaussant |url=http://gallica.bnf.fr/ark:/12148/bpt6k4801920w/f5.image] .
  
 
 Maisons de musiciens, éditions du Chêne, 1997 —  photographs by Christine Bastin, Jacques Évrard (illustrations).
 Paris vu du ciel, éditions du Chêne/la Martinière 1997, new. ed. 2000  — photographs by Yann Arthus-Bertrand.
 Paris des artistes : 1840-1940, éditions du Chêne 1998  — photographs by Jean-Marie Del Moral, 
 Le Siècle de feu de l’opéra italien, éditions du Chêne 2000 
  — English translation, Sicily, Land of the Leopard Princes published by Tauris Parke 2001.
 
 Maisons de musiciens, éditions du Chêne 1997  — photographs by Christine Bastin and Jaques Evrard; English edition Composers' houses: Seven Dials, 2000 .
 Piano, éditions du Chêne 2002  — photographic report Gilbert Nencioli.
 Jardins des plaisirs, Citadelles et Mazenod 2004  — photographs by Christine Bastin and Jacques Evrard.

Articles 
 La curiosité récompensée, in Les Nouvelles d’Arménie, October 1994 — introduction to pianist Édouard Exerjean.
  
 Quelques chansons maçonniques anglaises, in Renaissance Traditionnelle, N° 115–116, July–October 1998, .

Translations 
Gérard Gefen also translator works by English economist Andrew Shonfield for the éditions Gallimard, as well as other works in English, notably on music:
 Franco Zeffirelli, Portrait d'un homme du siècle, Belfond 1989 
 Andrei Gromyko, Mémoires, Belfond 1989  — translated from English by Françoise Du Sorbier, Gérard Gefen, Amal Naccache and Sabine Montagne.
 Bruce Oudes (éd.) De la part du Président : les archives secrètes de Richard Nixon, Belfond 1991  — translated from American by Gérard Géfen and Roxane Azimi; French edition prepared by Marie Cayrade.
 
 Herbert von Karajan, Une vie pour la musique, édition de l'Archipel 1999  — interview with Richard Osborne (from 1977 to June 1989).

References 

1934 births
2003 deaths
20th-century French musicologists
Classical music critics
20th-century French writers
French radio producers
20th-century French translators